KK Millenium Strumica (also known previously as KK Strumica 2005) was a Macedonian basketball club based in Strumica. It was founded in 1991 under the name Makedonija '91, and was later also known as Polo Trejd. After a change in leadership in 2005, the club became known as Strumica 2005 and new president, Pajanotis Karapiperis, formed a strong culture by bringing in significant players to the team. They become champions of the Macedonian First League in the 2006–07 season and were Macedonian Cup finalists in 2007 and 2008. However, following the 2007–08 season, the club canceled its participation in the First League and the newly formed Balkan League due to financial concerns. They continued to play in the Second League until 2012, where after winning the 2011–12 championship, they folded completely and merged with ABA Strumica.

Roster season 2007/2008

Depth chart

Strumica in FIBA competitions

1993 Radivoj Korać Cup
{| class="wikitable" style="text-align: left; font-size:95%"
|- bgcolor="#ccccff"
! Round
! Team
! Home
!   Away  
|-
|1.Round
| TIIT Kharkov
| style="text-align:center;"|97–75
| style="text-align:center;"|103–68
|-
|}1997 Eurocup2007 Eurocup'''

Notable past players

 Zlatko Gocevski
 Dime Tasovski
 Darko Sokolov
 Eftim Bogoev
 Viktor Krstevski
 Toni Grnčarov
 Tomčo Sokolov
 Dimče Gaštarski
 Slobodančo Hadživasilev
 Vassilis Kitsoulis
 Vasslis Tsimpliaridis
 Savvas Manousos
 Miljan Pupović
 Damir Latović
 Ivan Bošnjak
 Njegoš Abazović
 Nenad Delić
 Wesley Fluellen

References

External links 
 Team info at Basketball.org.mk
 

Basketball teams in North Macedonia
Sport in Strumica